Pedioplanis serodioi is a species of lizard in the family Lacertidae. The species is, as currently known,  endemic to southwestern Angola, but there is an unconfirmed record from northern Namibia.

References

Pedioplanis
Lacertid lizards of Africa
Reptiles of Angola
Endemic fauna of Angola
Reptiles described in 2021
Taxa named by Aaron M. Bauer
Taxa named by Luis M. P. Ceríaco
Taxa named by Matthew P. Heinicke